This list of the prehistoric life of Indiana contains the various prehistoric life-forms whose fossilized remains have been reported from within the US state of Indiana.

Precambrian
The Paleobiology Database records no known occurrences of Precambrian fossils in Indiana.

Paleozoic

Selected Paleozoic taxa of Indiana

  †Abrotocrinus
 †Abrotocrinus coreyi
 †Abrotocrinus nodosus
 †Abrotocrinus unicus
 †Achistrum
 †Achistrum brevis – type locality for species
 †Achistrum ludwigi
 †Achistrum nicholsoni
 †Achistrum triassicum
 †Acidaspis
 † Acrophyllum
 †Actinocrinites
 †Actinocrinites gibsoni
 †Actinocrinites grandissimus
 †Actinocrinites lobatus – tentative report
 †Actinocrinites lowei
 †Agaricocrinus
 †Agaricocrinus americanus
 †Aipoceras – tentative report
  †Alethopteris
 †Alethopteris davreuxi
 †Alethopteris decurrens
 †Alethopteris grandini
 †Alethopteris lonchitica
 †Alethopteris owenii
 †Alethopteris serlii
 Ammodiscus
 †Ammonellipsites
 †Amplexopora
 †Amplexus
 †Anchiopsis
 †Angustidontus
  †Annularia
 †Annularia mucronata
 †Annularia radiata
 †Annularia sphenophylloides
 †Annularia stellata
 †Aphlebia
  †Archimedes
 †Archimedes communis
 †Archimedes compactus
 †Archimedes distans
 †Archimedes intermedius
 †Archimedes invaginatus
 †Archimedes lativolvis
 †Archimedes macfarlani
 †Archimedes meekanoides
 †Archimedes meekanus
 †Archimedes negligens – or unidentified comparable form
 †Archimedes proutanus
 †Archimedes swallovanus
 †Archimedes swallowvanus
 †Archimedes symmetricus
 †Archimedes terebriformis
 †Arctinurus
 †Armenoceras
 †Artisia
 †Asterotheca
 †Asterotheca crenulata
 †Asterotheca cyathea
 †Asterotheca hemitelliodes
 †Asterotheca miltoni
 †Asterotheca oreopteridia
  †Asteroxylon
 †Athyris
 †Athyris fultonensis
 †Athyris lamellosa
 †Athyris parvirostra
 †Athyris spiriferoides
 †Atrypa
 †Atrypa newsomensis
 †Atrypa parva – or unidentified comparable form
 †Atrypa reticularis
 †Atrypa reticularus
 †Aulacophyllum
  †Aulopora
 †Aulopora edithana
 †Aulopora microbuccinata
 †Aulopora tubiporoides
 †Aviculopecten
 †Aviculopecten colletti
 †Aviculopecten invalidus
 †Aviculopecten spinuliferus
 †Aviculopecten terminalis
 † Avonia – tentative report
 † Avonia
  †Bellerophon
 †Bellerophon gibsoni – type locality for species
 †Bellerophon jeffersonensis
 †Bellerophon spergensis – type locality for species
 †Bembexia
 †Beyrichoceras
 †Bordonia
 †Bumastus
 †Bumastus armatus – or unidentified comparable form
 †Bumastus insignis
 †Bumastus ioxus
 †Bumastus niagarense – or unidentified comparable form
 †Calamites
 †Calamites cruciatus
 †Calamites suckowii
  †Callipteridium
 †Callixylon
 †Calymene
 †Calymene breviceps
 †Calymene celebra
 †Calymene niagarensis
 †Camarotoechia
 †Camarotoechia gregaria – tentative report
 †Camarotoechia horsfordi
 †Camarotoechia mutata
 †Camarotoechia neglecta – or unidentified comparable form
 †Camarotoechia pisa
 †Camarotoechia tethys
  †Carcinosoma
 †Caseodus
 †Caseodus eatoni – type locality for species
 †Ceramopora
 †Ceramopora imbricata
 †Ceramopora vesicularis
 †Ceraurinus
 †Ceraurus
 †Chancelloria
 †Charactoceras
  †Cheirurus
 †Chomatodus
 †Chondrites
 †Chonetes
 †Chonetes geniculatus
 †Cincinnetina
 †Cincinnetina meeki
 †Cincinnetina multisecta
 †Cladochonus
 †Cladochonus beecheri
 †Cladochonus crassus
 †Cladochonus longi
  †Cleiothyridina
 †Cleiothyridina hirsuta
 †Cleiothyridina sublamellosa
 †Clorinda – tentative report
 †Coenites
 †Coenites brownsportensis
 †Coenites cryptodens – or unidentified comparable form
 †Coenites laqueata – or unidentified comparable form
 †Coenites rectilineatus
 †Columnaria
 †Columnaria alveolata
  †Composita
 †Composita subquadrata
 †Composita sulcata
 †Composita trinuclea
 †Conchidium
 †Conocardium
 †Conocardium richmondense – type locality for species
  †Constellaria
 †Coolinia
  †Cordaites
 †Cordaites borassifolius
 †Cordaites crassinervis
 †Cordaites principalis
 †Cornulites
 †Cornulites formosa
 †Cornulites proprius
 †Coronura
 †Crania
 †Craniops
 †Crotalocrinites
  †Cyathocrinites
 †Cyathocrinites glenni – or unidentified comparable form
 †Cyathocrinites multibrachiatus
 †Cyathocrinites parvibrachiatus
 †Cyathocrinites pauli
 †Cyathocrinites sanduskyensis
 †Cyathocrinites striatissimus
 †Cyathocrinites wilsoni
 †Cyclonema
 †Cyclopteris
 †Cyphaspis
 †Cypricardinia
 †Cypricardinia indenta
 †Cypricardinia scitula
 †Cyrtolites
 †Cyrtospirifer
 †Cystodictya
 †Cystodictya lineata
  †Dalmanites
 †Dalmanites halli
 †Dalmanites limulurus
 †Danaea
 †Decadocrinus
 †Decadocrinus depressus
 †Dicoelosia
 †Dictyonema
 †Dimerocrinites
 †Dimerocrinites carleyi
 †Dimerocrinites inornatus
 †Dimerocrinites occidentalis
 †Dinicthys
 †Dizygocrinus
 †Dizygocrinus indianaensis
 †Dizygocrinus indianensis
 †Dizygocrinus venustus – or unidentified comparable form
 †Dizygocrinus whitei – or unidentified comparable form
 †Drepanopterus
  †Edestus
 †Edestus heinrichi
 †Edmondia
 †Eldredgeops
 †Eldredgeops rana
 †Elytron
 †Emmonsia
  †Encrinurus
 Eocaudina
 †Eodictyonella
 †Eospirifer
 †Eospirifer eudora
 †Eospirifer foggi
 †Eospirifer niagarensis
 †Eospirifer radiatus
 †Eretmocrinus
 †Eretmocrinus cassedayanus – tentative report
 †Eretmocrinus magnificus
  †Erieopterus
 †Eucalyptocrinites
 †Eucalyptocrinites caelatus
 †Eucalyptocrinites crassus
 †Eucalyptocrinites tuberculatus
  †Favosites
 †Favosites arbor
 †Favosites baculus
 †Favosites biloculi
 †Favosites clelandi
 †Favosites cristatus
 †Favosites discoideus
 †Favosites favosus
 †Favosites forbesi
 †Favosites forbsei
 †Favosites goodwini
 †Favosites hisingeri
 †Favosites hispidus – or unidentified comparable form
 †Favosites impeditus
 †Favosites mundus
 †Favosites niagarensis
 †Favosites occidentalis
 †Favosites patellatus – type locality for species
 †Favosites pirum
 †Favosites placentus
 †Favosites proximatus
 †Favosites quercus
 †Favosites ramulosus
 †Favosites rotundituba
 †Favosites spinigerus
 †Favosites turbinatus
 †Fayettoceras
  †Fenestella
 †Fenestella burlingtonensis
 †Fenestella cestriensis
 †Fenestella exigua
 †Fenestella matheri
 †Fletcheria
 †Flexicalymene
 †Flexicalymene meeki
 †Gilbertsocrinus
  †Glikmanius
 †Glikmanius occidentalis
 †Glyptambon
 †Glyptocrinus
 †Gomphoceras
 †Greenops
  †Grewingkia
 †Grewingkia canadensis
 †Grewingkia rusticum
 †Hallopora
 †Hallopora elegantula
 †Hallopora subnodosa
  †Halysites
 †Halysites catenularia
 †Halysites labyrinthicus
 †Halysites microporus
 †Harpidium – tentative report
 †Heliophyllum
 †Heliophyllum agassizi
 †Heliophyllum denticulatum
 †Heliophyllum halli
 †Heliophyllum incrassatum
 †Heliophyllum latericrescens
 †Heliophyllum venatum
 †Heliophyllum verticale
  †Hexagonaria
 †Hexagonaria bella
 †Hexagonaria cincta
 †Hexagonaria curta
 †Hexagonaria ovoidea
 †Hexagonaria partita
 †Hexagonaria ponderosa
 †Hexagonaria prisma
 †Hexameroceras
 †Hindia
 †Holopea
 †Hyolithes
 †Icriodus
 †Illaenus
  †Iniopteryx
 †Iniopteryx rushlaui
 †Iocrinus
 †Isotelus
 †Isotelus gigas
 †Isotelus maximus
 †Kindleoceras
 †Kingstonia
 †Kionoceras
 †Kokomopterus
 †Lambeoceras
  †Lepidodendron
 †Lepidodendron aculeatum
 †Lepidodendron dichotomum
 †Lepidodendron lanceolatum – tentative report
 †Lepidodendron obovatum
 †Lepidodendron vestitum
 †Lepidophyllum
 †Lepidostrobus
 †Lichas
 †Lingula
 †Llanoaspis – tentative report
 †Manitoulinoceras
 †Marsupiocrinus
 †Martinia
 †Melonechinus
  †Meristella
 †Meristina
 †Microplasma
  †Mucrospirifer
 †Mucrospirifer mucronatus
 †Mucrospirifer profundus
 †Mucrospirifer prolificus
 †Murchisonia
  †Natica
 †Naticopsis
 †Naticopsis carleyana – type locality for species
  †Neuropteris
 †Neuropteris fimbriata
 †Neuropteris flexuosa
 †Neuropteris heterophylla
 †Neuropteris obliqua
 †Neuropteris ovata
 †Neuropteris rarinervis
 †Neuropteris scheuchzeri
 †Neuropteris tenuifolia
 †Odontopleura – tentative report
 †Oncoceras
 †Onychocrinus
 †Onychopterella
 †Oonoceras
 †Ornithoprion – type locality for genus
  †Orodus
 †Palmatolepis
 †Paolia – type locality for genus
  †Paraspirifer
 †Pecopteris
 †Pelagiella
 †Pentagonia
 †Pentameroceras
 †Pentamerus
 †Pentremites
 †Pentremites tulipaformis
 †Periastron
 †Periechocrinus
  †Phacops
 †Phillipsia
 †Phragmolites
 †Pinna
 †Pinnularia
 †Plaesiomys
 †Platyceras
 †Platyceras bucculentum
 †Platycrinites
  †Platystrophia
 †Platystrophia acutilirata
 †Platystrophia annieana
 †Platystrophia clarksvillensis
 †Platystrophia cypha
 †Platystrophia moritura
 †Plectodonta
  †Pleurodictyum
 †Pleurorthoceras
 †Poleumita
 †Polygnathus
 †Polysacos – type locality for genus
 Priscopedatus
 †Proetus
 †Protochonetes – tentative report
 †Protosalvinia
  †Psaronius
 †Pteria
 †Pterotheca
  †Pterygotus
 †Quasillites – tentative report
 †Retzia
 †Rhadinichthys
 †Rhynchonella
 †Richmondoceras – type locality for genus
 †Rineceras
 †Rota
 †Samaropsis
 †Sandalodus
 †Scytalocrinus
 †Sidetes
  †Sigillaria
 †Sigillaria brardii
 †Sigillaria scutellata
 †Skenidioides
 †Sowerbyella
 †Spathognathodus
 †Sphaerexochus
 †Sphaerocodium
  †Sphenophyllum
 †Sphenophyllum cuneifolium
 †Sphenophyllum emarginatum
 †Sphenophyllum myriophyllum
 †Sphenophyllum plurifoliatum
 †Sphenopteris
 †Spirifer
 Spirorbis
 †Spyroceras
  †Stethacanthus
 †Stethacanthus altonensis
 †Stigmaria
 †Stigmatella
  †Strophomena
 †Strophomena concordensis
 †Strophomena erratica
 †Strophomena extenuata
 †Strophomena neglecta
 †Strophomena nutans
 †Strophomena planumbona
 †Strophomena sulcata
 †Syringopora
 †Taxocrinus
 †Tentaculites
 †Tetradium
 †Thalassinoides
 †Treptoceras
 †Tricrepicephalus
 †Trimerus
 †Zittelloceras
 †Zoophycos

Mesozoic
The Paleobiology Database records no known occurrences of Mesozoic fossils in Indiana.

Cenozoic

 Acer
  †Aepycamelus – or unidentified comparable form
 Alces
 †Alces alces
 †Arctodus
 †Arctodus simus
 †Bensonomys
 †Bensonomys hershkovitzi – type locality for species
 †Bootherium
 †Bootherium bombifrons
  †Borophagus
 †Bryum
 Bufo
 Candona
 †Candona crogmaniana – or unidentified comparable form
 †Candona elliptica – or unidentified related form
 Canis
  †Canis dirus – or unidentified comparable form
 †Canis latrans – or unidentified comparable form
 †Canis lupus
 †Carex
 Carya
 Chara
 Chelydra
  †Chelydra serpentina – or unidentified comparable form
 Chrysemys
 †Chrysemys picta – or unidentified comparable form
 Coluber
 †Coluber constrictor
 Comptonia – or unidentified comparable form
 Cyperus
 Cypridopsis
 †Cypridopsis okeechobei – or unidentified related form
 †Cypridopsis vidua – or unidentified comparable form
 Elaphe
 Emydoidea
 †Emydoidea blandingii – or unidentified comparable form
 Equus
 †Equus complicatus – or unidentified comparable form
 Fagus
 †Fagus grandifolia – or unidentified comparable form
 Geomys
 †Geomys adamsi – or unidentified comparable form
 †Geomys bursarius – or unidentified comparable form
 †Hemiauchenia – or unidentified comparable form
 †Hesperotestudo
  †Hypolagus
 †Hypolagus fontinalis – or unidentified comparable form
 Lynx
 †Lynx rufus – or unidentified comparable form
 Lyonia – or unidentified comparable form
 †Mammut
  †Mammut americanum
 Marmota
 †Marmota monax
 Mephitis
 †Mephitis mephitis
 Microtus
 †Microtus ochrogaster – or unidentified comparable form
 Mustela
  †Mylohyus
 †Mylohyus fossilis
 Neotoma
 †Neotoma floridana – or unidentified comparable form
 Nerodia
 †Nerodia erythrogaster – or unidentified comparable form
 Odocoileus
  †Odocoileus virginianus
 Ogmodontomys
 †Ogmodontomys pipecreekensis – type locality for species
 †Oxalis
 †Paleoheterodon
 †Paleoheterodon tiheni
 Panthera
  †Panthera onca
 †Paracoluber
 †Paracoluber storei
 Parascalops
 †Parascalops breweri
 Peromyscus
 †Peromyscus leucopus – or unidentified comparable form
 Platanus
 †Platanus occidentalis
  †Platygonus
 †Platygonus vetus – or unidentified comparable form
 †Plionarctos
 †Plionarctos edensis
 †Pliophenacomys
 †Pliophenacomys koenigswaldi – type locality for species
 Polygonum
 Populus
 †Populus deltoides – or unidentified comparable form
 †Potamocypris
 †Potamocypris unicaudata – or unidentified related form
 †Potamogeton
 †Potentilla
 †Rana
 †Rana catesbeiana – or unidentified comparable form
 Rumex
 Salix
 †Scirpus
  †Smilodon
 †Smilodon fatalis
 Spermophilus
 †Spermophilus howelli
 Spilogale
 †Spilogale putorius – or unidentified comparable form
 †Symmetrodontomys
 †Symmetrodontomys daamsi – type locality for species
 Synaptomys
 †Synaptomys cooperi
  †Teleoceras
 Thamnophis
 Trachemys
 †Trachemys scripta – or unidentified comparable form
 Urocyon
 †Urocyon cinereoargenteus
 Ursus
  †Ursus americanus – or unidentified comparable form
 †Verbena
 †Viola
 Vitis
 Vulpes
 †Xanthium

References
 

Indiana